Ersin Tacir (born April 1, 1985 in Van, Turkey) is a Turkish racewalker. He is a member of PTT SK.

He earned a quota spot for 2016 Summer Olympics with his performance in the 20 km race walk event at the European Athletics Poděbrady Walking 2016 in the Czech Republic. His time of 1:22:19 is a new national record as well.

References

1985 births
Sportspeople from Van, Turkey
Turkish male racewalkers
Living people
Athletes (track and field) at the 2016 Summer Olympics
Olympic athletes of Turkey
21st-century Turkish people